Steam plate cake (commonly known as Kinnathappam in Kerala, India) is a popular traditional sweet cake widely consumed in Kerala. There are two variants of Kinnathappam. One is white and another is black. long but the white variant is much easy to cook and it is very soft compared to black variant.

See also
 Kalathappam
 Poduthol

References

External links

Kerala cuisine